Oncidium crispum is a species of orchid endemic to eastern and southern Brazil.

References

External links 

crispum
Endemic orchids of Brazil